Ceroplesis mucorea is a species of beetle in the family Cerambycidae. It was described by Kolbe in 1893. It is known from Tanzania.

References

Endemic fauna of Tanzania
mucorea
Beetles described in 1893